Evan Sharp (born 1982) is an American billionaire Internet entrepreneur. He is the co-founder and chief design and creative officer of Pinterest, a visual discovery engine. He joined the company's board of directors in March 2019.

Early life
Sharp was born in 1982. He was raised in York, Pennsylvania and attended York Suburban School District. Both his parents were park rangers. His father was an enthusiastic computer hobbyist. As a child, Sharp spent a lot of time tinkering with his father's Macintosh and taught himself how to code.

Sharp attended York Suburban High School where he graduated in 2001. During his high school years, he spent his free time creating icons and user interfaces.

He graduated from the University of Chicago, where he earned a bachelor's degree in history. He subsequently studied architecture at Columbia Graduate School of Architecture, Planning and Preservation.

Career
Sharp met Ben Silbermann in New York through a mutual friend in 2009 and they immediately connected over their love of the Internet. Together with third cofounder Paul Sciarra, the three built the very first version of Pinterest from a small apartment in New York City on West 103rd Street. He soon thereafter moved to California, where he worked as a product designer at Facebook.

The first desktop version of Pinterest was launched in March 2010 from a makeshift office — a two-bedroom apartment in the heart of Palo Alto that they shared with another start-up.

Sharp is credited with designing and coding Pinterest and the Pinterest grid for the initial product launch in March 2010. Over the years, he has overseen the creative, product and design teams

On October 14, 2021, Pinterest announced that Sharp would leave his post as a Chief Design & Creative Officer at the company to join Jony Ive's LoveFrom. Sharp will reportedly stay on Pinterest's board of directors and serve as the company's advisory.

Honors and awards 
In 2018, Jony Ive, British industrial designer and outgoing Chief Design Officer (CDO) of Apple, chose Sharp as the figure in technology he believes will change the future. Interviewed by Wired Magazine, Ive said about Sharp: “He understands that complex problems can be simplified and often resolved visually. Nuance and subtlety characterize his work. He doesn’t just address a functional imperative.”

Sharp was named one of the most creative people in business by Fast Company in 2014.

Personal life
Sharp married Christina McBride in 2014. He resides in San Francisco, California. According to Forbes, he is worth an estimated $1 billion as of 2018.

References

External links

Evan Sharp on Pinterest

Living people
1982 births
People from York, Pennsylvania
Businesspeople from San Francisco
University of Chicago alumni
Columbia Graduate School of Architecture, Planning and Preservation alumni
American Internet company founders
American billionaires
Pinterest people